Demir Avdić (born 10 October 1990) is a Serbian professional footballer who plays as a forward.

Career 
On 4 December 2020, Avdić joined I-League side Chennai City. He made his debut on 9 January 2021, in a 2–1 win over Gokulam Kerala.

References

External links
 
 

1990 births
Living people
Serbian footballers
Sportspeople from Novi Pazar
Association football forwards
FK Novi Pazar players
FK Sinđelić Niš players
FK Ibar Rožaje players
Götene IF players
Mqabba F.C. players
FK Zlatibor Čajetina players
KF Trepça '89 players
FK Drina Zvornik players
FC Mauerwerk players
Chennai City FC players
Montenegrin Second League players
Serbian SuperLiga players
Football Superleague of Kosovo players
First League of the Republika Srpska players
Austrian 2. Landesliga players
Austrian Regionalliga players
I-League players
Serbian expatriate footballers
Serbian expatriate sportspeople in Montenegro
Serbian expatriate sportspeople in Sweden
Serbian expatriate sportspeople in Malta
Serbian expatriate sportspeople in Kosovo
Serbian expatriate sportspeople in Bosnia and Herzegovina
Serbian expatriate sportspeople in Austria
Serbian expatriate sportspeople in India
Expatriate footballers in Montenegro
Expatriate footballers in Sweden
Expatriate footballers in Malta
Expatriate footballers in Kosovo
Expatriate footballers in Bosnia and Herzegovina
Expatriate footballers in Austria
Expatriate footballers in India